The 1956–57 Sheffield Shield season was the 55th season of the Sheffield Shield, the domestic first-class cricket competition of Australia. New South Wales won the championship for the fourth consecutive year. All five teams played each other home and away for the first time.

Table

Statistics

Most Runs
Ken Meuleman 779

Most Wickets
Lindsay Kline 37

References

Sheffield Shield
Sheffield Shield
Sheffield Shield seasons